Sredny Aradirikh is a rural locality (a selo) and the administrative centre of Aradirikhsky Selsoviet, Gumbetovsky District, Republic of Dagestan, Russia. The population was 577 as of 2010. There are 2 streets.

Geography 
Sredny Aradirikh is located 50 km southeast of Mekhelta (the district's administrative centre) by road. Nizhny Aradirikh and Verkhny Aradirikh are the nearest rural localities.

References 

Rural localities in Gumbetovsky District